Cancer Nursing Practice is a monthly peer-reviewed nursing journal which covers the practice of oncology nursing. It also publishes news, news analysis, and opinion columns on topics relevant to oncology nurses. It is published by RCNi. The editor-in-chief is Jennifer Sprinks. The journal is available by subscription and is a member of the Committee on Publication Ethics.

See also

 List of nursing journals

External links

Marijuana and Cancer

Oncology nursing journals
Monthly journals
Royal College of Nursing publications
English-language journals